Tzafria is a religious moshav in central Israel. Located near Ben Gurion International Airport, it falls under the jurisdiction of Sdot Dan Regional Council.

History
During the Ottoman period, the area of Tzafria belonged to the Nahiyeh (sub-district) of Lod that encompassed the area of the present-day city of Modi'in-Maccabim-Re'ut in the south to the present-day city of El'ad in the north, and from the foothills in the east, through the Lod Valley to the outskirts of Jaffa in the west. This area was home to thousands of inhabitants in about 20 villages, who had at their disposal tens of thousands of hectares of prime agricultural land.

The village was founded in 1949 by immigrants from Czechoslovakia and Hungary on the land of the  depopulated Palestinian  village of al-Safiriyya. Its name is derived from that village and was initially called Safria Alef and then Kfar Tzafria before adopting its current name.

References

Moshavim
Religious Israeli communities
Populated places established in 1949
Populated places in Central District (Israel)
1949 establishments in Israel
Czech-Jewish culture in Israel
Hungarian-Jewish culture in Israel
Slovak-Jewish culture in Israel